Invincible is the tenth and final studio album by American singer Michael Jackson, released on October 30, 2001, by Epic Records. It was Jackson's sixth studio album released through Epic, and his last released before his death in 2009. The album features appearances from Carlos Santana, the Notorious B.I.G. and Slash. It incorporates R&B, pop and soul, and, similarly to Jackson's previous material, the album explores themes such as love, romance, isolation, media criticism, and social issues.

The album's creation was expensive and laborious. Jackson started the multi-genre production in 1997 and did not finish until eight weeks before the album's October 2001 release. It was reported that it cost $30 million to make the album, making it the most expensive album ever made. There was no concert tour to promote Invincible; Jackson refused to tour, adding to the already growing rift between him and Sony Music Entertainment. Following Sony's decision to abruptly end promotion for the album, Jackson made allegations in July 2002 that Tommy Mottola was a "devil" and a "racist" who did not support his African-American artists but used them for personal gain.

Invincible debuted at number one on the Billboard 200 albums chart in the United States and in ten other countries worldwide. The album was certified double Platinum in January 2002 by the Recording Industry Association of America (RIAA) and has sold over 8 million copies worldwide. The album's lead single, "You Rock My World", peaked at number ten on the US Billboard Hot 100 and was nominated for Best Male Pop Vocal Performance at the 2002 Grammy Awards. The album spawned two more singles, "Cry" and "Butterflies", as well as the promotional single "Speechless".

Invincible received mixed reviews from music critics, and became Jackson's most critically derided album. Retrospective reviews have been more positive, and the album has been credited as featuring early examples of dubstep. In 2009, it was voted by online readers of Billboard magazine as the best album of the decade.

Production
Prior to the release of Invincible, Jackson had not released any new material since Blood on the Dance Floor: HIStory in the Mix in 1997. His last studio album was HIStory (1995). Invincible was thus looked at as Jackson's "career comeback".

Jackson began recording new material in October 1997, and finished with "You Are My Life" being recorded only eight weeks before the album's release in October 2001 – the most extensive recording of Jackson's career. The tracks with Rodney Jerkins were recorded at the Hit Factory in Miami, Florida. Jackson had shown interest in including a rapper on at least one song, and had noted that he did not want a 'known rapper'. Jackson's spokesperson suggested New Jersey rapper named Fats; after Jackson heard the finished product of the song, the two agreed to record another song together for the album.

Rodney Jerkins stated that Jackson was looking to record material in a different musical direction than his previous work, describing the new direction as "edgier". Jackson received credit for both writing and producing a majority of the songs on Invincible.  Aside from Jackson, the album features productions by Jerkins, Teddy Riley, Andre Harris, Andraeo "Fanatic" Heard, Kenneth "Babyface" Edmonds, R. Kelly and Dr. Freeze Bill Gray and writing credits from Kelly, Fred Jerkins III, LaShawn Daniels, Nora Payne and Robert Smith. The album is the third collaboration between Jackson and Riley, the other two being Dangerous and Blood on the Dance Floor: HIStory in the Mix. Invincible is Jackson's tenth and final studio album to have been recorded and released during his lifetime. It was reported that it cost thirty million dollars to make the album, making it the most expensive album ever made.

Invincible was dedicated to the fifteen-year-old Afro-Norwegian boy Benjamin "Benny" Hermansen who was stabbed to death by a group of neo-Nazis in Oslo, Norway, in January 2001. The reason for this tribute was partly due to the fact that another Oslo youth, Omer Bhatti, Jackson's friend, was also a good friend of Hermansen. The dedication in the album reads, "Michael Jackson gives 'special thanks': This album is dedicated to Benjamin 'Benny' Hermansen. May we continue to remember not to judge a man by the color of his skin, but the content of his character. Benjamin ... we love you ... may you rest in peace." The album is also dedicated to Nicholette Sottile and his parents Joseph and Katherine Jackson.

Music and lyrics
Invincible is an R&B, pop and soul record. The album's full length lasts over 77 minutes and contains 16 songs – fifteen of which were written (or co-written) by Jackson. It was noted that the album shifts between aggressive songs and ballads. Invincible opens with "Unbreakable"; the last line in the first verse recites the lyrics, "With all that I've been through/I'm still around". In a 2002 interview with the magazine Vibe, Jackson commented on his inspiration for writing "Speechless", saying:

"Privacy", a reflection on Jackson's own personal experiences, is about media invasions and tabloid inaccuracies. "The Lost Children" is about imperiled children. Jackson sings in a third person in "Whatever Happens". The song's lyrics, described by Rolling Stone magazine as having a "jagged intensity", narrate the story of two people involved in an unnamed threatening situation. Invincible features four ballads: "You Are My Life", "Butterflies", "Don't Walk Away" and "Cry". "Cry", similar to Jackson's "Man in the Mirror", is about healing the world together. The lyrics to "Butterflies" and "Break of Dawn" were viewed as "glaringly banal" and it was implied that they could have been written by anyone.  "Threatened" was viewed as being a storyteller. The song was viewed as a "Thriller redux". The song "You Are My Life" is about Jackson's two children at the time, Prince and Paris. The song features Jackson singing, "You are the sun, you make me shine, more like the stars."

Singles

The album spawned three official singles ("You Rock My World", "Cry" and "Butterflies") and a promotional single in South Korea ("Speechless"), although all were given limited releases.  "You Rock My World" was only released to radio airplay in the United States, consequently only peaking at number ten on the Billboard Hot 100. Internationally, where it was released as a commercial single, it reached number one in France, number two in Norway, Finland, Denmark, Belgium, and the United Kingdom, number three in Italy, number four in Australia, and five in Sweden and Switzerland. The second single, "Cry", was not released in the United States. It was only moderately successful, with the song's most successful territories being Spain, Denmark, France, and Belgium, charting at number six, sixteen, thirty and thirty-one.

The album's third single, "Butterflies", was only released in the United States to radio airplay. It reached number 14 on the Billboard Hot 100 and at number two for five weeks on the Hot R&B/Hip-Hop Singles Chart.  "Heaven Can Wait" also charted at the bottom of the R&B/Hip-Hop Charts, at number 72 due to radio airplay without an official release; the song did not chart internationally. "Unbreakable" was originally supposed to be released as a single, but it was ultimately cancelled. Despite that, the song managed to chart inside the Romanian Top 100 chart, peaking at number 62. It was later included on The Ultimate Collection box set in 2004.

Promotion 

It was reported that the album had a budget of twenty five million dollars set aside for promotion. Despite this, however, due to the conflicts between Jackson and his record label, little was done to promote the album. Unlike with Jackson's post-Thriller adult studio albums, there was no world tour to promote the album; a tour was planned, but cancelled due to conflicts between Jackson and Sony, and the September 11 attacks (the latter of which had also motivated many other artists to cancel their then-upcoming concerts in late 2001 and early 2002.) There was, however, a special 30th Anniversary celebration at Madison Square Garden in early September 2001 to mark Jackson's 30th year as a solo artist. Jackson performed "You Rock My World" and marked his first appearance onstage alongside his brothers since the Jacksons' Victory Tour in 1984. The show also featured performances by Britney Spears, Mýa, Usher, Whitney Houston, Tamia, Backstreet Boys, 'N Sync, 98 Degrees, and Slash, among other artists. The show aired on CBS in November 2001 as a two-hour television special and garnered 30 million viewers.

The album's promotion was met with trouble due to internal conflicts with Sony Music Entertainment and Jackson due to his part of ownership with the company and the contract to this deal with Sony that was originally signed back in 1991. The issue stemmed back during the production of Invincible when Jackson learned that the rights to the masters of his past releases, which were to revert to him in the early 2000s, wouldn't actually revert to him until much later in the decade. When Jackson went to the lawyer who worked with him in making the deal back in 1991, he learned that the same lawyer was also working for Sony, revealing a conflict of interest he was never aware of. Not wanting to sign away his ownership in Sony Music Entertainment, Jackson elected to leave the company shortly after the album's release. After the announcement, Sony halted promotion on the album, cancelling single releases, including a 9/11 charity single that was intended to be released before Invincible.

In July 2002, following Sony's decision to abruptly end promotion for the album, Jackson made allegations that Mottola was a "devil" and a "racist" who did not support his African-American artists but used them for personal gain. He accused Sony and the record industry of racism, deliberately not promoting or actively working against promotion of his album. Sony disputed claims that they had failed to promote Invincible with sufficient energy, maintaining that Jackson refused to tour in the United States.

Critical reception

Invincible received mixed reviews from professional critics. At Metacritic, which assigns a rating out of 100 to reviews from mainstream critics, the album received a mixed score of 51 based on 19 reviews. David Browne of Entertainment Weekly, felt that Invincible is Jackson's "first album since Off the Wall that offers virtually no new twists" but remarked that the album "feels like an anthology of his less-than-greatest hits".

James Hunter of Rolling Stone critiqued that the album's later ballads made the record too long. Hunter also commented that Jackson and Riley made "Whatever Happens" "something really handsome and smart", allowing listeners "to concentrate on the track's momentous rhythms" such as "Santana's passionate interjections and Lubbock's wonderfully arranged symphonic sweeps". Mark Beaumont of NME called it "a relevant and rejuvenated comeback album made overlong", while Blender also found it "long-winded".

Reviewing for The Village Voice, Robert Christgau said that Jackson's skills as a musician are often forgotten, but noted that the album seemed too long compared to other Jackson albums. While Christgau felt some material was "offensive", he described the album's first three tracks as being the "Rodney Jerkins of the year" adding that he did not "believe the [album's] hype matters". Nikki Tranter of PopMatters said that it is both innovative and meaningful because exceptional songs such as "The Lost Children" and "Whatever Happens" more than make up for overly sentimental songs like "Heaven Can Wait" and "You Are My Life". Q magazine said that it is an aurally interesting, albeit inconsistent, album.

In a negative review for The New York Times, Jon Pareles suggested that the album is somewhat impersonal and humorless, as Jackson rehashes ideas from his past songs and is "so busy trying to dazzle listeners that he forgets to have any fun." In a retrospective review for The Rolling Stone Album Guide, Pareles said that Invincible showed Jackson had lost his suave quality to "grim calculation".

Invincible received one Grammy Award nomination at the 2002 ceremony. The album's song "You Rock My World" was nominated for Best Pop Vocal Performance – Male, but lost to James Taylor's "Don't Let Me Be Lonely Tonight". Due to the album's release in October 2001, it was not eligible for any other nomination from the 2002 Grammy Awards.

Retrospective reviews 
In retrospective reviews, Invincible has gained more positive reviews and has been cited as an early development of dubstep. 

AllMusic editor Stephen Thomas Erlewine commented that it has a "spark" and "sound better than anything Jackson has done since Dangerous." Erlewine noted that while the album had good material it was "not enough to make Invincible the comeback Jackson needed – he really would have had to have an album that sounded free instead of constrained for that to work – but it does offer a reminder that he can really craft good pop." Writing for PopDose, Mike Heyliger wrote "Invincible isn't the piece of shit most claim it to be. A leaner structure to the album and more sympathetic production would have resulted in a classic. But when measured against the radio junk that passes for pop-R&B these days, Invincible is stronger than ever." In December 2009 readers of Billboard voted Invincible the best album of the decade.

Commercial performance
Invincible was Jackson's first studio album since HIStory six years earlier. It debuted at number one on the Billboard 200, with first-week sales of 363,000 units. It was Jackson's fifth Billboard 200 number-one, and his fourth solo album to chart at number one in its first week; however, it sold less than HIStory in its opening week, which sold 391,000 units. In its second week, the album slip to number 3 selling 202,000 copies with a 45%. Invincible also charted at number one on the Billboard R&B/Hip Hop Albums Chart for four weeks. After eight weeks of release, in December 2001, Invincible was certified gold by the Recording Industry Association of America (RIAA) for the sales of five hundred thousand units. In the same month, the album was certified platinum for the sale of one million units. On January 25, 2002, it was certified two times platinum for the sales of two million units. In the United States, it was 45th best selling album of 2001 selling over 1.56 millions units. As of 2009, Invincible had sold 2.4 million copies in the United States.

Invincible left the Billboard 200 in June 2002 after charting there for 28 weeks. Shortly after the release of the album, in a poll conducted by Billboard magazine, "an overwhelming majority" of people—79% of 5,195 voters—were not surprised by Invincible entering the Billboard 200 at number one. Billboard also reported that 44% agreed with the statement, proclaiming that Jackson was "still the King of Pop". Another 35% said they were not surprised by the album's ranking, but doubted Invincible would hold on for a second week at the top of the chart. Only 12% of people who responded to the poll said they were surprised by the album's charting debut because of Jackson's career over the past six years and another 9% were taken aback by the album's success, in light of the negativity that preceded the album's release.

Invincible reached number one in twelve countries worldwide, including the United Kingdom, Australia, Belgium, Denmark, the Netherlands, Germany, Norway, Sweden and Switzerland. It also charted within the top ten in several countries, including Austria, Canada, Finland, Italy, New Zealand, and Norway.

Invincible was certified platinum by the British Phonographic Industry, for the sales of over 300,000 units in the United Kingdom. The album was certified platinum by the International Federation of the Phonographic Industry (IFPI) for the sales of 40,000 units in Switzerland. The IFPI also certified the album gold in Austria for the sales of 15,000 units. Australian Recording Industry Association certified Invincible two times platinum for the sales of 140,000 units in Australia. Invincible was the eleventh best-selling album of 2001 according to the International Federation of the Phonographic Industry with 5.4 million copies. Since then, the album has sold more than 8 million units worldwide.

Following Jackson's death in June 2009, his music experienced a surge in popularity. Invincible charted at number twelve on the Billboard Digital Albums Chart on July 11, 2009. Having not charted on the chart prior to its peak position, the album was listed as the ninth biggest jump on that chart that week. It also charted within the top ten, peaking at number nine, on Billboards Catalog Albums Chart on the issue date of July 18. On the week of July 19, 2009, Invincible charted at number eighteen in Italy. Invincible peaked at number sixty four on the European Albums Chart on the charts issue date of July 25. The album also charted at number twenty nine in Mexico in July, and eighty four on the Swiss Albums Chart on July 19, 2009.

Track listing

Notes
The rap verse by The Notorious B.I.G. in "Unbreakable" was originally from the second verse of the song "You Can't Stop the Reign" by Shaquille O'Neal.
"Break of Dawn", "2000 Watts" and "Threatened" were excluded from the original Chinese release. In the Chinese edition of the box set The Collection released in 2013, all 16 tracks are included.

Credits

Personnel
Credits adapted from Invincible album liner notes.

 Michael Jackson – lead vocals , background vocals , arranger , multiple instruments , programming , drum programming , orchestral arrangements and conducting , keyboard programming 
 Marsha Ambrosius – background vocals 
 Maxi Anderson – vocals 
 Gloria Augustus – vocals 
 Babyface – acoustic guitar, bass guitar, background vocals, drum programming, and keyboards 
 Tom Bahler – youth choir conductor 
 Emanuel "Bucket" Baker – drums 
 Rose Beatty – youth choir 
 Edie Lehmann Boddicker – youth choir 
 Robert Bolyard – youth choir 
 Norman Jeff Bradshaw – horns 
 Brandy – additional background vocals 
 Stuart Brawley –  whistle solo 
 Mary Brown – additional background vocals 
 Tim Brown – vocals 
 Brad Buxer – drum programming , keyboards , keyboard programming 
 David Campbell – string arrangement 
 Matt Cappy – horns 
 Martha Cowan – youth choir 
 Andraé Crouch – vocals 
 Sandra Crouch – vocals 
 Paulinho da Costa – percussion 
 LaShawn Daniels – background vocals 
 Valerie Doby – vocals 
 Dr. Freeze – background vocals , multiple instruments 
 Monique Donally – youth choir 
 Kevin Dorsey – vocals 
 Marja Dozier – vocals 
 Alfie Silas Durio – vocals 
 Nathan East – bass guitar 
 Jason Edmonds – choir 
 Geary Lanier Faggett – vocals 
 Vonciele Faggett – vocals 
 Fats – rap 
 Lynn Fiddmont-Lindsey – choir 
 Kirstin Fife – violin 
 Judy Gossett – vocals 
 Harold Green – vocals 
 Jonathon Hall – youth choir 
 Justine Hall – youth choir 
 Andre Harris – multiple instruments 
 Scottie Haskell – youth choir 
 Micha Haupman – youth choir 
 Tess (Teresa) Escoto – youth choir 
 Gerald Heyward – drums 
 Tabia Ivery – choir 
 Luana Jackman – youth choir 
 Prince Jackson – narrative 
 Rodney Jerkins – multiple instruments , programming 
 Tenika Johns – vocals 
 Angela Johnson – vocals 
 Daniel Johnson – vocals 
 Zaneta M. Johnson – vocals 
 Laquentan Jordan – vocals 
 R. Kelly – choir arrangement 
 Peter Kent – violin 
 Gina Kronstadt – violin 
 Michael Landau – guitar 
 James Lively – youth choir 
 Robin Lorentz – violin 
 Jeremy Lubbock – orchestral arrangements and conducting 
 Brandon Lucas – youth choir 
 Jonathon Lucas – youth choir 
 Ricky Lucchse – youth choir 
 Melissa MacKay – youth choir 
 Alex Martinez – youth choir 
 Howard McCrary – vocals 
 Linda McCrary – vocals 
 Sam McCrary – vocals 
 Alice Jean McRath – vocals 
 Sue Merriett – vocals 
 Bill Meyers – string arrangements 
 Mischke – background vocals 
 Patrice Morris – vocals 
 Kristle Murden – vocals 
 The Notorious B.I.G. – rap 
 Novi Novog – viola and contractor 
 Nora Payne – background vocals 
 Que – background vocals 
 Teddy Riley – multiple instruments  additional background vocals 
 John Robinson – drums 
 Baby Rubba – narrative 
 Carlos Santana – guitar and whistle solo 
 Deborah Sharp-Taylor – vocals 
 F. Sheridan – youth choir 
 Slash – guitar solo 
 Andrew Snyder – youth choir 
 Sally Stevens – youth choir 
 Richard Stites – additional background vocals 
 Thomas Tally – viola 
 Brett Tattersol – youth choir 
 Ron Taylor – vocals 
 Michael Thompson – guitar 
 Chris Tucker – introduction 
 Mario Vasquez – additional background vocals 
 Johnnie Walker – vocals 
 Nathan "N8" Walton – choir 
 Rick Williams – guitar 
 Yvonne Williams – vocals 
 Zandra Williams – vocals 
 John Wittenberg – violin

Record production
Executive producer: Michael Jackson
Produced by Michael Jackson , Rodney Jerkins , Dr. Freeze , Teddy Riley , Andre Harris , Babyface , R. Kelly 
Co-produced by Andreao "Fanatic" Heard" and Nate Smith , Richard Stites 
Recorded by Bruce Swedien , Teddy Riley , Rodney Jerkins , Stuart Brawley , Brad Gilderman , Dexter Simmons , George Mayers , Jean-Marie Horvat , Brad Buxer , Mike Ging , Paul Boutin , Andre Harris , Humberto Gatica 
Assistant engineers: Rob Herrera, Craig Durrance, Kevin Scott, Steve Robillard, Franny Graham, Richard Thomas Ash, Chris Carroll, Dave Ashton, Christine Tramontano, Vidal Davis 
Rap recorded by Bob Brown 
Strings recorded by Tommy Vicari 
Assisted by Steve Genewick
Production coordinator: Ivy Skoff
Mixed by Bruce Swedien , Teddy Riley , Rodney Jerkins , Michael Jackson , Mick Guzauski , Stuart Brawley , George Mayers , Jean-Marie Horvat , Jon Gass , Humberto Gatica 
Assisted by Kb and EQ 
Mastered by Bernie Grundman
Additional digital editing and engineering by Michael Prince
Art direction: Nancy Donald, David Coleman, Adam Owett
Cover design: Steven Hankinson
Photography: Albert Watson
Illustration: Uri Geller
Make-Up and hair: Karen Faye
Vocal consultant: Seth Riggs
Archivist: Craig Johnson

Charts

Weekly charts

Year-end charts

Certifications and sales

References

Bibliography 
George, Nelson (2004). Michael Jackson: The Ultimate Collection booklet. Sony BMG.

External links
 

2001 albums
Michael Jackson albums
Epic Records albums
Albums produced by Michael Jackson
Albums produced by Babyface (musician)
Albums produced by Rodney Jerkins
Albums produced by R. Kelly
Albums produced by Teddy Riley
Albums recorded at Capitol Studios